Billy Budd is a 1962 British historical drama-adventure film produced, directed, and co-written by Peter Ustinov. Adapted from Louis O. Coxe and Robert H. Chapman's stage play version of Herman Melville's short novel Billy Budd, it stars Terence Stamp as Billy Budd, Robert Ryan as John Claggart, and Ustinov as Captain Vere. In his feature film debut, Stamp was nominated for an Academy Award for Best Supporting Actor, and received a Golden Globe Award for Most Promising Male Newcomer. The film was nominated for four BAFTAs.

Plot
In the year 1797, the British naval vessel HMS Avenger presses into service a crewman "according to the Rights of War" from the merchant ship The Rights of Man. The new crewman, Billy Budd, is considered naive by his shipmates, and they attempt to indoctrinate him in their cynicism. But Budd's steadfast optimism remains; when asked to critique the horrible stew the crew must eat, he offers "It's hot. And there's a lot of it. I like everything about it except the flavor." The crew discovers Budd stammers in his speech when anxious.

Though Budd manages to enchant the crew, his attempts at befriending the brutal master-at-arms, John Claggart, are unsuccessful. Claggart is cruel and unrepentant, a man who controls the crew through vicious flogging, savaging them before they can prey on him.

Claggart orders Squeak to find means of putting Budd on report and to implicate him in a planned mutiny. He then brings his charges to the Captain, Edwin Fairfax Vere. Vere summons both Claggart and Budd to his cabin for a private confrontation. When Claggart makes his false charges that Budd is a conspirator, Budd stammers, unable to find the words to respond, and he strikes Claggart - who falls backward against a block and tackle and fatally injures himself.

Captain Vere assembles a court-martial. Though aware of the background to Budd and Claggart's conflict, the captain is also torn between morality and duty to his station. Vere intervenes in the final stages of deliberations - which at that point are in support of Budd - to argues the defendant must be found guilty for even striking Claggart, not to mention killing him. His argument that the letter of the law matters is successful, and Budd is convicted.

Condemned to be hanged from the ship's yardarm at dawn the following morning, Budd takes care to wear his good shoes. At Budd's final words, "God bless Captain Vere!", Vere crumbles, and Budd is subsequently hoisted up and hanged on the ship's rigging. The crew is on the verge of mutiny over the incident, but Vere can only stare off into the distance. Just as the crew is to be fired upon by the ship's marine detachment, a French vessel appears and commences cannon fire on the Avenger. The crew breaks off from the potential mutinty to  return fire, and in the course of battle a piece of the ship's rigging falls on Vere, killing him. The ship's figurehead is also shot off while a narrator tells of Budd's heroic sacrifice.

Cast
 Robert Ryan as John Claggart, Master d'Arms
 Peter Ustinov as Edwin Fairfax Vere, Post Captain
 Terence Stamp as Billy Budd
 Melvyn Douglas as The Dansker, sailmaker
 Paul Rogers as Philip Seymour, 1st Lieutenant
 John Neville as Julian Radcliffe, 2nd Lieutenant
 David McCallum as Steven Wyatt, Gunnery Officer
 Ronald Lewis as Enoch Jenkins, maintopman
 Lee Montague as Squeak, Mr. Claggart's assistant
 Thomas Heathcote as Alan Payne, maintopman
 Ray McAnally as William O'Daniel, maintopman
 Robert Brown as Talbot
 John Meillon as Neil Kincaid, maintopman
 Cyril Luckham as Hallam, Captain of Marines
 Niall MacGinnis as Captain Nathaniel Graveling

Production
In addition to serving as director, Ustinov also produces and co-stars in the feature. His dedication to the film appears to emanate from his identification with the characters in the story. He said, "I am an optimist, unrepentant and militant. After all, in order not to be a fool an optimist must know how sad a place the world can be. It is only the pessimist who finds this out anew every day."
 
On the novel itself, Melville had been writing poetry for 30 years when he returned to fiction with Billy Budd in late 1888. Still unfinished when he died in 1891, Melville's widow worked to help complete it, but it remained unpublished. Melville's biographer accidentally stumbled upon it when going through a trunk of the writer's papers in his granddaughter's New Jersey home in 1919, and it was finally published in 1924. Over the years other versions were published, but it was not until Melville's original notes were found that the definitive version was ultimately published in 1962. Coincidentally, this movie version, made in continental Europe and England, was released the same year.

Reception
Stanley Kauffmann of The New Republic wrote Billy Budd was 'in almost every way a failure, and it is (Peter) Ustinov's fault.'.

In its opening weekend in Leicester Square, London, it grossed a house record $12,000.

The review aggregator website Rotten Tomatoes reports an 91% approval rating based on 11 reviews.

Awards and honours

References

Further reading
 Tibbetts, John C., and James M. Welsh, eds. The Encyclopedia of Novels Into Film (2nd ed. 2005) pp 33–34.

External links

 
 
 
 
 

1962 films
1960s adventure drama films
1960s historical adventure films
British historical adventure films
British adventure drama films
Films based on works by Herman Melville
Films based on American novels
British films based on plays
CinemaScope films
Films based on adaptations
Films directed by Peter Ustinov
Films scored by Antony Hopkins
Films set in 1797
Films shot at Associated British Studios
Military courtroom films
Seafaring films
1962 drama films
1960s English-language films
1960s British films